Antônio Carlos Corrêa (born 17 May 1963), known as Toninho Carlos, is a Brazilian footballer. He played in four matches for the Brazil national football team in 1983. He was also part of Brazil's squad for the 1983 Copa América tournament.

References

1963 births
Living people
Brazilian footballers
Brazil international footballers
Association football defenders
Footballers from São Paulo (state)
People from Lins, São Paulo